Lussan is the name or part of the name of several communes in France:

 Lussan, in the Gard department
 Lussan, former commune of the Haute-Garonne department, now part of Lussan-Adeilhac
 Lussan, in the Gers department
 Lussan-Adeilhac, in the Haute-Garonne department
 Fons-sur-Lussan, in the Gard department

See also
 Lussant, in the Charente-Maritime department